Bas Oskam, better known by his stage name Noisecontrollers, is a Dutch DJ and hardstyle music producer based in Veenendaal, Netherlands. Noisecontrollers was formerly a duo before Arjan Terpstra left the project in 2013, prompting Oskam to continue as a solo act. They are regarded as one of the pioneers of hardstyle music. Since leaving the project, Terpstra has been producing music using the stage name Bloqshot, focusing on different musical styles.

Career 
Noisecontrollers produces melodious hardstyle sound. They debuted on DJ Mag's annual Top 100 DJs ranking at 90th in 2010. They have released songs on Fusion Records, Scantraxx Records and on their own label Digital Age. They released their debut album titled "E=Nc² (The Science Of Hardstyle)". In 2012, Noisecontrollers created the Defqon.1 anthem collaborating with Wildstylez and Headhunterz. In 2013, they created the Decibel anthem collaborating with Alpha Twins. In 2014, Oskam released All Around, the first album since Terpstra's departure from the project. In 2014, he performed at the Defqon.1 festival in Sydney, Australia. In 2015, he performed at the TomorrowWorld music festival. In August 2015, he performed at Decibel Outdoor Festival. In 2016, he performed with Sander van Doorn at Defqon.1.

They founded the label "Digital Age" with Joram Metekohy, also known as Wildstylez.

Discography

Studio albums

Compilation albums

Extended plays

Charted singles

Other singles 

 "Das Boot" (with Atmozfears and B-Front) (2019)

Awards and nominations

DJ Mag

Top 100 DJs Ranking

References 

Living people
Dutch electronic musicians
Hardstyle musicians
1980 births
Dutch DJs
People from Veenendaal
Electronic dance music DJs